Walter William Bygraves  (16 October 1922 – 31 August 2012), best known by the stage name Max Bygraves (adopted in honour of Max Miller), was an English comedian, singer, actor and variety performer. He appeared on his own television shows, sometimes performing comedy sketches between songs. He made twenty Royal Variety Performance appearances and presented numerous programmes, including Family Fortunes between 1983 and 1985. His catchphrase "I wanna tell you a story" became an integral part of his act, although it had originated with comedian Mike Yarwood impersonating Bygraves.

Early life
Bygraves was born to Henry and Lillian ( McDonnell) Bygraves (who wed in 1919) in Rotherhithe in London, where he grew up in a two-room council flat in Park Buildings, Paradise Street with his five siblings, his parents and a grandparent. His father was a professional flyweight boxer, known as Battling Tom Smith, and a casual dockworker. Brought up Catholic, he attended St Joseph's School, Paradise Street, Rotherhithe, and sang with his school choir at Westminster Cathedral.

He left school at 14, working at the Savoy Hotel in London as a pageboy, but was sacked for being too tall. He later put some of his success as a variety performer down to his lanky physique. He then became a messenger for W S Crawfords, an advertising agency at 233 High Holborn before serving as a fitter in the Royal Air Force in the Second World War and working as a carpenter. He changed his name to Max Bygraves in honour of comedian Max Miller.

Career
After the end of the war, Bygraves worked on building sites, while entertaining in pubs in the evenings. An early variety stage appearance in January 1945 was at the Grand, Clapham with a review stating "A new impressionist. Max Bygraves, is also a lad to be watched. He has a little to learn in the art of showmanship, but not much, but there is no denying the brilliance of his impersonations."

In August 1946, he toured in a variety show with Frankie Howerd, who in turn introduced him to Eric Sykes, and they began writing routines together. With Sykes, he also developed the radio show Educating Archie, starring ventriloquist Peter Brough and his dummy Archie Andrews, and featuring Bygraves in the role of Archie's teacher. The idea for the programme came from record producer Wally Ridley, who produced Bygraves' records during the 1950s.

In July 1950, he made his first appearance at the London Palladium supporting Abbott and Costello, and in 1951 he supported Judy Garland in her appearance there. Arising from this, she invited him to perform at the Palace in New York in October 1951.

Bygraves became a successful recording artist with seven top ten hits on the UK Singles Chart between 1952 and 1960. Many were novelty songs. One of his most popular recordings, "You Need Hands" in 1958, was written by Bygraves under the pseudonym Roy Irwin (or Erwin), a name picked at random from a telephone directory. He also wrote its follow-up, "Gotta Have Rain". His producer Wally Ridley said of Bygraves:"Max's great talent was that he could punch lines, which was absolutely great for us. We'd give him songs with very short lines and he'd punch them out marvellously. Give him a long line and he would stumble over it, although I just flipped when I was given 'Gilly Gilly Ossenfeffer Katzenellen Bogen by the Sea'. I thought, 'Fabulous, fabulous, this is a major hit for us.' I took it to Max and his wife, Blossom, said, 'That's no good, what does it mean?'... The song was absolutely perfect for Max and its whole secret was 'What the hell does it mean?"

He also occasionally worked as an actor, appearing in British films including Bless 'Em All (1948) and Tom Brown's Schooldays (1951). Bygraves appeared as himself in the 1954 British film musical Harmony Lane directed by Lewis Gilbert, and 'What Now, Davros!', with Helen Ball. He portrayed the title character in the 1956 film Charley Moon and starred in the 1961 drama Spare the Rod. In 1959, Bygraves bought the past and future rights to the Lionel Bart musical Oliver! for £350 at a time when Bart was experiencing severe financial difficulties. Bygraves later sold them for £250,000.

In the 1950s and 1960s, Bygraves appeared as a guest on several television variety programmes, both in the UK and United States. These included Ed Sullivan, Jack Benny and Jackie Gleason, in America. He was the subject of This Is Your Life in 1961 when he was surprised by Eamonn Andrews while rehearsing his new show, Do Re Mi at London's Prince of Wales Theatre. He appeared in several TV series including the sitcom Roamin' Holiday and the variety shows Max and Max Bygraves at the Royalty. From 1983 to 1985, Bygraves hosted Family Fortunes, taking over from his friend and fellow comedian Bob Monkhouse. He would later be succeeded as host in 1987 by Les Dennis.

From 1972, Bygraves recorded a series of albums, Sing Along With Max (later Singalongamax), in which he sang medleys of familiar songs aimed at an older audience. The albums, for Pye Records, sold millions of copies and led to spinoff shows and more recordings. In 1977, UK publishing house W. H. Allen published Bygraves' comic novel The Milkman's on His Way.

Bygraves' catchphrase was said to be: "I wanna tell you a story". It was actually Mike Yarwood who made up that phrase, from Bygraves' "I want to tell you a joke", though Bygraves adopted Yarwood's version as the title of his own memoirs. Another well-known phrase of his was "That's a good idea, son!".

Honours
In 1982, Bygraves was made an Officer of the Order of the British Empire (OBE).

Personal life
Bygraves married WAAF sergeant Gladys "Blossom" Murray in 1942. The couple had three children. Bygraves also had three other children from extramarital affairs.

On 9 August 1974, Bygraves became stuck on a cliff near his house in Westbourne, Bournemouth, when a kite flown by his grandson Michael became trapped beneath the edge of the cliff. He suffered friction burns on his hands and was in shock when police and firefighters helped him to safety. In 1999, Bygraves underwent treatment for an ear disorder, having cancelled a number of performances on his doctor's advice.

He and Blossom Bygraves moved from Bournemouth to Queensland, Australia, in 2008. She died there in 2011 at the age of 88.

Death
Bygraves was diagnosed with Alzheimer's disease in 2010, and he died from complications of this illness at his daughter's home in Hope Island, Queensland, Australia on the evening of 31 August 2012.

Television
Whack-O! (1960)
The Royal Variety Performance (1961; 1963 etc.)
The Jack Benny Program (1963, season 13, episode 13)
It's Sad About Eddie (1964)
Max Bygraves meets The Black and White Minstrels (1965, 1 episode)
Max (1969–74)
Max Bygraves Says "I Wanna Tell You a Story" (1976–77)
Singalongamax (1978–80)
Max Bygraves – Side by Side (1982)
Family Fortunes (1983–85)
The Mind of David Berglas (1986)
Call Up the Stars (1995)
Against the Odds RAF Documentary (2001)

Partial filmography
 Bless 'Em All (1948)
 The Nitwits on Parade (1949)
 Skimpy in the Navy (1949)
 Tom Brown's Schooldays (1951)
 Charley Moon (1956)
 A Cry from the Streets (1958)
 Bobbikins (1959)
 Spare the Rod (1961)
 The Alf Garnett Saga (1972)
 The Jigsaw Man (1983) Uncredited cameo appearance (policeman)

Discography

Chart singles

Albums
 Show Stoppers (1962)
 Sing Along with Max (1972) No. 4
 Sing Along with Max Vol. 2 (1972) No. 11
 Singalongamax Vol. 3 (1973) No. 5
 Singalongamax Vol. 4 (1973) No. 7
 Singalongapartysong (1973) No. 15
 You Make Me Feel Like Singing a Song (1974) No. 39
 Singalongaxmas (1974) No. 21
 100 Golden Greats (1976) No. 3
 Lingalongamax (1978) No. 39
 Discolongamax (1979) No. 47
 The Song and Dance Men (1978) No. 67
 Singalongawaryears (1989) No. 5
 Singalongawaryears Volume 2 (1989) No. 33

References

External links

1922 births
2012 deaths
Male actors from London
Deaths from Alzheimer's disease
Neurological disease deaths in Queensland
English comedy musicians
English expatriates in Australia
English game show hosts
English male film actors
English male singers
English male television actors
English Roman Catholics
Military personnel from London
Pye Records artists
Officers of the Order of the British Empire
People from Dagenham
Musicians from Bournemouth
Royal Air Force personnel of World War II
Singers from London
20th-century English comedians
21st-century English comedians
British novelty song performers
Royal Air Force airmen
Decca Records artists
Philips Records artists
Actors from Bournemouth